Brolle (born Kjell Junior Wallmark, November 10, 1981), is a Swedish singer and musician who was discovered in the Kanal 5 series Popstars in 2001.

Brolle was born in Boden. Although he did not reach the final of Popstars, Brolle soon got a record deal and released his first single Playing with fire. He has also done musicals such as Footloose (in which he replaced Måns Zelmerlöw) and he performed music by Buddy Holly.

Discography

Albums

Singles
2002: "Last Night"
2002: "Playing with Fire" 
2002: "Heartbreak City" 
2004: "Watching the Stars"
2004: "Sound of a Drum"
2004: "Let It Rain" 
2005: "Sommarkort - En stund på jorden" 
2008: "Solo i Stockholm" 
2008: "Fashion"
2010: "Anything She Wants"

References

1981 births
Living people
21st-century Swedish singers
21st-century Swedish male singers
Melodifestivalen contestants of 2011